Charles French  (10 September 1842 – 21 May 1933) was an Australian horticulturist, naturalist, entomologist and plant/seed collector who made significant contributions to economic entomology.

Early life
French was born in Lewisham, Kent, England, the son of John French (died 1848) and Ellen, née Tucker. Ellen remarried and the young French moved to Melbourne with his family in 1852. They settled in Cheltenham, a suburb of Melbourne.

Career
French became interested in natural history and was apprenticed to a nurseryman at Hawthorn, James Scott. French then worked at the South Yarra nurseries where he later met Ferdinand von Mueller, director of the Royal Botanic Gardens, Melbourne.
In 1865 Mueller appointed French to the staff at the Gardens.

In 1873 William Guilfoyle was appointed curator of the Gardens and French was placed in charge of fern propagation in the nursery complex.

French had resumed his interest in insects in 1860. In 1874 he co-authored an article on timber-boring insects which appeared in the  
annual report of the Department of Agriculture. This is considered the first publication on economic entomology in Victoria.
In 1889 French was appointed first Victorian government entomologist and in 1891 published Part I of his A Handbook of the Destructive Insects of Victoria. Four further parts were published by 1911. A sixth part was completed but not published until the rediscovery of his manuscript in 2011. French was also the author of some pamphlets, and papers by him were published in the Victorian Naturalist and other journals. In 1907 he attended the International Conference of Entomologists in London.

Late life and legacy
French retired in 1908 and was succeeded by his son, Charles Hamilton French. He was a foundation committee-member of the Field Naturalists Club of Victoria in 1880. It grew into a flourishing organization and remained a great interest to French during a long retirement.
French was a fellow of the Linnean Society of London, of the Royal Horticultural Society of England and of the Society of Isis, Dresden, Germany.

French died in Malvern, Melbourne, on 21 May 1933; he was survived by his third wife, a son and daughter from the first marriage and a daughter from his second marriage.

Works

Handbook of the destructive insects of Victoria; Volumes I-V  1891–1911; (Volume VI, with text and coloured plates, was prepared but never published.)

References

R. T. M. Pescott, 'French, Charles (1842 - 1933)', Australian Dictionary of Biography, Volume 8, MUP, 1981, pp 585–586.

Additional sources listed by the Dictionary of Australian Biography:
E. E. Pescott, The Victorian Naturalist, July 1933; The Cyclopedia of Victoria, 1903; The Argus, Melbourne, 23 May 1933.

Additional sources listed by the Australian Dictionary of Biography:
J. H. Willis, Botanical Pioneers in Victoria (Melbourne, 1949); R. T. M. Pescott, History of the Royal Botanic Gardens, Melbourne (manuscript, privately held).

1842 births
1933 deaths
People from Lewisham
Australian entomologists
Scientists from Melbourne
English emigrants to Australia